Yobe State is one of the 36 States of Nigeria situated at Northeastern part of Nigeria with Damaturu as the state capital. Here is the list of tertiary institutions in Yobe State including the public and private universities, polytechnics and colleges.

List of Federal tertiary tnstitutions
 Federal University Gashua
 Federal College of Education (Technical), Potiskum
 Federal Polytechnic Damaturu
 College of Nursing Sciences Nguru

List of state tertiary institutions
 Yobe State University, Damaturu
 Umar Suleiman College of Education, Gashua
 Mai Idriss Alooma Polytechnic, Geidam
 Atiku Abubakar College of Legal and Islamic Studies, Nguru
 Shehu Sule College of Nursing and Midwifery, Damaturu
 College of Health, Sciences and Technology, Nguru
 Yobe State College of Agriculture, Gujba
 College of Administration, Management and Technology, Potiskum

List of private tertiary institutions
 Al-Ma'arif College of Health Science and Technology, Potiskum
 College of Education Jibwis, Potiskum

See also
 List of tertiary institutions in Abuja
 List of tertiary institutions in Ogun State
 List of tertiary institutions in Ondo State

References

Yobe
Yobe State